Claremont is an incorporated town in Surry County, Virginia, United States. The population was 378 at the 2010 census. A granite marker stands as a memorial to the arrival of British settlers in the area. The town was incorporated in 1886, had a port on the James River, and gained railroad service as a terminus for a while before being abandoned. Claremont was home to the Temperance, Industrial, and Collegiate Institute, a school for African Americans founded by a former slave. The area includes a historical marker commemorating the institution.

History 
A granite marker in a circle in the center of town commemorates the landing here on May 5, 1607, of English settlers. Beginning in the late 17th and early 18th centuries, Claremont was a busy port town on the navigable portion of the James River, shipping many goods, but especially hogsheads of tobacco.

After the Civil War, Willie Allen, who inherited Claremont Manor, moved to New York and sold the property. J. Frank Mancha, a Maryland real estate developer took on the project to develop, subdivide and colonize a new town there in 1879. Incorporated in 1886, the town of Claremont became the eastern terminus of the new Atlantic and Danville Railway (A&D), a narrow gauge railroad, which was completed to a point near Emporia called James River Junction, where it connected with a standard gauge track towards Danville. Unfortunately for Claremont, the A&D decided to connect its western leg with a new eastern terminus in West Norfolk on the harbor of Hampton Roads, and the line to Claremont, which was never standard-gauged, went into semi-abandonment. After some use for lumber transport as the Surry, Sussex and Southampton Railway, the rails were removed in the late 1930s.

In the years since, the area has remained as a rural enclave, but some resort use developed along the bluffs and beaches of the James River. Many homes along the riverfront were badly damaged, and Claremont's neighboring beach, Sunken Meadow’s was destroyed in 2003 by Hurricane Isabel.

In 2006, the old A&D station at Claremont Beach (village, not the wharf) was still standing.

Geography
Claremont is located at  (37.227291, -76.965458).

According to the United States Census Bureau, the town has a total area of 2.5 square miles (6.6 km2), all of it land.

Demographics

As of the census of 2000, there were 343 people, 147 households, and 99 families residing in the town. The population density was 135.3 people per square mile (52.1/km2). There were 240 housing units at an average density of 94.6 per square mile (36.5/km2). The racial makeup of the town was 73.18% White, 22.74% African American, 2.04% Native American, and 2.04% from two or more races.

There were 147 households, out of which 23.1% had children under the age of 18 living with them, 53.7% were married couples living together, 9.5% had a female householder with no husband present, and 32.0% were non-families. 27.9% of all households were made up of individuals, and 11.6% had someone living alone who was 65 years of age or older. The average household size was 2.33 and the average family size was 2.83.

In the town, the population was spread out, with 19.8% under the age of 18, 5.8% from 18 to 24, 25.7% from 25 to 44, 31.5% from 45 to 64, and 17.2% who were 65 years of age or older. The median age was 44 years. For every 100 females, there were 92.7 males. For every 100 females age 18 and over, there were 92.3 males.

The median income for a household in the town was $34,643, and the median income for a family was $46,667. Males had a median income of $42,250 versus $30,000 for females. The per capita income for the town was $22,741. About 6.3% of families and 7.5% of the population were below the poverty line, including none of those under age 18 and 10.2% of those age 65 or over.

Temperance, Industrial, and Collegiate Institute
Dr. John Jefferson Smallwood established Temperance, Industrial, and Collegiate Institute in Claremont on October 12, 1892 with fewer than 10 students. Smallwood was born enslaved in Rich Square, North Carolina in 1863. The school's campus covered more than 65 acres along the James River and served boys and girls from Virginia as well as other states.

The Richmond Planet covered the opening of Lincoln Memorial Hall on its campus in 1912, a significant accomplishment for the Institute. Smallwood became severely ill in September of that same year, and was taken to the Retreat for the Sick in Richmond, Virginia. He died on September 29, 1912, at the age of 49. 

After Smallwood's death, a period of mergers and name changes followed. When the school closed in 1928 it had more than 2,000 alumni. A marker commemorating the school is at  37° 9.931′ N, 76° 58.404′ W. in Spring Grove, Virginia at the intersection of Colonial Trail West (Virginia Route 10) and Martin Luther King Highway (Virginia Route 40), on the right when traveling east on Colonial Trail West. A prominent memorial to Smallwood may be found at the Abundant Life Church Cemetery in Spring Grove, Virginia.

References

External links
 Town of Claremont History

Towns in Surry County, Virginia
Towns in Virginia
Populated places on the James River (Virginia)